Shambles is an obsolete term for an open-air slaughterhouse and meat market.

Shambles or The Shambles may also refer to:

The Shambles, a historic street in York, England
Shambles Square, Manchester, England
Shambles Glacier, Adelaide Island, Antarctica
The Shambles (band), an American power pop and rock band
Shambles (film), 2016 Canadian film directed by Karl Lemieux
The Shambles, the person Gregor Smith
The Shambles, a street in the lower part of Totnes, Devon (England)
The Shambles, a dangerous sandbank off Portland Bill, Dorset (England)